CSM Făgăraș may refer to:

 CSM Făgăraș (football), a men's football club
 CSM Făgăraș (men's handball), a men's handball club